Branco Antonio Provoste Ovalle (born April 14, 2000) is a Chilean football player who plays as a midfielder for Ñublense in the Chilean Primera División.

International career
At early age, he represented Chile at under-15 level at the 2015 South American U-15 Championship and Chile U17 at the 2015 South American U-17 Championship, at two friendly matches against USA U17, at the 2017 South American U-17 Championship – Chile was the runner-up – and at the 2017 FIFA U-17 World Cup. Also, he played all the matches for Chile U17 at the friendly tournament Lafarge Foot Avenir 2017 in France, better known as Tournament Limoges, where Chile became champion after defeating Belgium U18 and Poland U18 and drawing France U18.

Career statistics

Notes

Honours

Club
Colo-Colo
 Primera División (1): 2017–T
 Copa Chile (2): 2016, 2017
 Supercopa de Chile (2): 2017, 2018

International
Chile U17
Tournoi de Limoges: 2017

References

External links

2000 births
Living people
People from Santiago
People from Santiago Province, Chile
People from Santiago Metropolitan Region
Footballers from Santiago
Chilean footballers
Chile youth international footballers
Chilean Primera División players
Colo-Colo footballers
Ñublense footballers
Association football midfielders